Clarence Taylor is an Amreican history professor and author. Clarence Taylor may also refer to:

Clarence D. Taylor, one of many pen names of J. Mallorquí (1913–1972), prolific Spanish writer
Clarence J. Taylor (1894–1988), chief justice of the Idaho Supreme Court
Clarence Gilbert Taylor (1898–1988), early aviation entrepreneur and co-founder of the Taylor Brothers Aircraft Corporation